Ernest Leak (28 October 1872 – 22 August 1945) was an Australian cricketer. He played in twelve first-class matches for South Australia between 1895 and 1910.

See also
 List of South Australian representative cricketers

References

External links
 

1872 births
1945 deaths
Australian cricketers
South Australia cricketers
Cricketers from Adelaide